Stereo Kicks were an English-Irish boy band who were formed and finished fifth place on the eleventh series of The X Factor in 2014. Stereo Kicks consisted of; James Graham, Jake Sims, Chris Leonard, Charlie Jones, Casey Johnson, Barclay Beales, Reece Bibby, and Tom Mann. Their debut single "Love Me So" was released on 21 June 2015 and charted at number 31 on the UK Singles Chart. Just a month later, however, having been together under a year, they announced they were disbanding due to their failure to land a record deal.

History

2014: Formation and The X Factor
All eight members of Stereo Kicks originally auditioned as soloists for series 11 of The X Factor in front of judges Simon Cowell, Louis Walsh, Cheryl Fernandez-Versini and Mel B, but were all rejected at the bootcamp stage. They were formed by the judges because they felt they were rejects that they could work with. The group first sang together at bootcamp within hours of being put together; they performed a cover of the Snow Patrol song "Run". They received a standing ovation from all four judges with Cowell saying that they were one of the best boybands they had ever had on the show. As a result, they got through straight to the judges' houses stage, mentored by Walsh. At that stage they sang Justin Timberlake's "Mirrors" and later got sent to the live shows. The fans suggested names through the ITV website; they received over 46,000 entries. Stereo Kicks' reception has been very favourable with Cowell saying they were "one of the best [groups] ever [to feature on the show]" and the public comparing them to be "as good as One Direction" and their performance of "Run" reached 1 million views on The X Factor's YouTube channel a week after its upload on 28 September. Initially called the "New Boy Band", they later held a poll on the website to determine a new name and "Stereo Kicks" was chosen.

Stereo Kicks performed Katy Perry's "Roar" in the first week of the live shows. They landed in the sing-off during week two with Chloe Jasmine, but were saved when Walsh, Mel B and Cowell opted to send Jasmine home. They were in the sing-off again in week 4 against Lola Saunders. With Walsh and Mel B opting to save them, the result went to deadlock and Saunders was eliminated as the contestant with fewest public votes. With the eliminations of Blonde Electra and Overload Generation in week 1 and Only The Young in week 7, Stereo Kicks became Walsh's last remaining act in the competition. In the quarter-final, they were in the bottom two with Lauren Platt. The result went to deadlock, and were eliminated, finishing in fifth place.

Performances during the show

2015: Debut single and split
On 20 April 2015, Stereo Kicks announced their debut single "Love Me So". Written by Mann and released on 21 June 2015, it charted at number 31 on the UK Singles Chart and was the number-one physical single the same week. The single also charted in Ireland where it entered and peaked at number 80 on the IRMA Charts.

On 18 July 2015, after just eleven months together, the band announced via their Facebook page that, having failed to land a major record deal, they would be disbanding. Their final performance together saw them headlining Thorpe Park's Island Beats event the following week.

Members

Barclay Beales
Barclay Beales (born 27 August 1995) is from Devon. He auditioned for the tenth series of The X Factor in 2013 and got eliminated in the Bootcamp stage by Louis Walsh. He used to yodel. He came back for series 11, performing Chris Isaak's "Wicked Game" in his Room Audition and Robbie Williams's "Angels" at the Arena.

Chris Leonard
Chris Leonard (born 3 September 1995) is from Meath, Ireland. He also auditioned for the tenth series of The X Factor and got eliminated in the Bootcamp stage by Gary Barlow, but as part of the boyband Out of the Blue; because they forgot their lyrics. He came back for series 11, but as a soloist. None of his auditions were broadcast.

Tom Mann
Tom Mann (born 3 November 1993) is a football coach from Southampton. Like Beales, he also auditioned for the series 10 of The X Factor but was eliminated in the bootcamp stage by Louis Walsh. Mann came back for series 11. He sang an original song at the arena that he wrote the day after Walsh eliminated him, but Simon Cowell stopped him (then getting a good reaction by the audience) and said: "I think if you were ugly you never would have got that reaction", Walsh himself and Cheryl told Cowell to give him a second chance and then Mann performed an acoustic version of the Backstreet Boys' "I Want It That Way" and got three yeses. He was the oldest member of the group. Mann has since worked as a songwriter and producer for other artists.

James Graham
James Graham (born 12 October 1996) is from Essex. He performed James Morrison's "You Give Me Something" in his Room Audition, getting a very good reaction from the judges, and Bonnie Raitt's "I Can't Make You Love Me" at the Arena; Mel B said that his performance was "soulful and sexy.” He won the second season of The Four: Battle for Stardom and was awarded a recording contract with Republic Records.

Reece Bibby
Reece Bibby (born 13 August 1998) is from Accrington. He auditioned at the Room with an acoustic rendition of Disclosure's "Latch" and wowed the judges. He went on to become a member of the band, New Hope Club who are signed to Steady Records/Hollywood Records and have had international success.

Jake Sims
Jake Sims (born 26 November 1994) is from Bristol. He sang Stevie Wonder's "Superstition" in his Room Audition, with his little sister present, and Arctic Monkeys' "When the Sun Goes Down" at the Arena.

Casey Johnson
Casey Johnson (1 May 1995) is from London. He performed Olly Murs' "Please Don't Let Me Go" in his room audition In May 2016, Johnson joined the band Union J, but later left in April 2017. He also starred in the E4 series, Stage School.

Charlie Jones
Charlie Jones (20 December 1999) is from Kent. He sang One Direction's "Little Things" in his Room Audition, and the Spice Girls' "Wannabe" at the Arena, stunning the judges and the audience. He is also well known for his viral song on YouTube, "Belieber for Life". He was the youngest member of the band. He became a member of the 5-piece band Over Atlantic, who were active from 2016 to 2018.

Discography
Singles

References

External links 
 

British boy bands
British pop music groups
Musical groups established in 2014
Musical groups disestablished in 2015
The X Factor (British TV series) contestants
2014 establishments in England